Turnover is an American rock band from Virginia Beach, Virginia. Formed in 2009, the band is signed with the Run for Cover Records label. Turnover has released five albums, two EPs and a handful of singles.

History
Turnover began in 2009. In 2012, they signed to Run for Cover Records. Since then, they have released two extended plays, two splits, and four full-length albums. In December 2011 and January 2012, the band went on a winter tour with True Things. In 2012, the band went on a summer tour with Citizen and Light Years.

Soon after their summer tour, the band went on a seven date tour in August with Young Statues and PJ Bond. In June 2013, the band went on a co-headlining tour with Koji, supported by Ivy League, and Have Mercy. In February 2014, the band went on an east coast tour with Turnstile, Diamond Youth, Angel Dust, and Blind Justice. In March 2014, the band went on tour with I Am the Avalanche, The Swellers, and Diamond Youth. In May 2014, the band went on two UK tours. One tour was with I Am the Avalanche, Major League, and Moose Blood. The other tour was with Major League and Nai Harvest. In fall of 2014, the band went on a tour with Light Years and Malfunction.

The band went on a 25 date tour in March and April 2015, supporting New Found Glory. In March 2015, the band announced plans to release their second studio album, titled Peripheral Vision in May via Run For Cover. The album's lead single, "Cutting My Fingers Off", came out on March 16, 2015. The album was released on May 4, 2015.

The band continued as a three-piece, with a fill-in lead guitarist joining them for touring commitments. The band's third album, Good Nature, was announced for an August 2017 release days later. The lead single, "Super Natural," was released to YouTube and streaming services on the same day. The album was produced by Will Yip and released on Run for Cover.

In 2019 the band released their fourth studio album, Altogether.

In 2022, the band released their fifth studio album, Myself in the Way.

Musical style
Magnolia has been described as emo and pop punk. Peripheral Vision has been described as indie rock, pop, and dream pop.

Band members

Current members
Austin Getz – vocals (2009–present), rhythm guitar (2012–present), lead guitar (2013–2014, 2017–2022), keyboards (2019–present)
Casey Getz – drums (2009–present)
Danny Dempsey – bass guitar (2009–present)
Nick Rayfield – lead guitar (2022–present; touring musician 2017–2022)

Former members
 Alex Dimaiuat – rhythm guitar (2009–2012)
 Kyle Kojan – lead guitar (2009–2013)
 Eric Soucy – lead guitar (2014–2017)
 Shane Moran – rhythm guitar (2019–2022; touring)

Discography

Studio albums
 Magnolia (2013)
 Peripheral Vision (2015)
 Good Nature (2017)
 Altogether (2019)
 Myself in the Way (2022)

References

American pop punk groups
Dream pop musical groups
Indie rock musical groups from Virginia
2009 establishments in Virginia
Musical groups established in 2009
Musical quartets
Musicians from Virginia Beach, Virginia
Run for Cover Records artists